Scientists Against Time is a book by  James Phinney Baxter III. It was published in 1946 by Little, Brown and Company, and won the 1947 Pulitzer Prize for History.

References 

Pulitzer Prize for History-winning works
1946 non-fiction books
Little, Brown and Company books